Nova Scotia wine is Canadian wine produced in the Canadian province of Nova Scotia. Nova Scotia's wineries are primarily organized under the Wine Association of Nova Scotia, though not all wineries are members. The industry began in the late 1970s with the original Grand Pré Winery in the Annapolis Valley of Nova Scotia.

Location 

The Nova Scotia wine region can be divided into 4 main regions: Annapolis Valley, Gaspereau Valley, South Shore, and the Malagash Peninsula. Besides these main regions, grapes intended for wine production are being produced by independent growers across the province, including Cape Breton Island.

History 
Grape growing in Nova Scotia has been documented as early as the 1600s, where writing has noted that vines were planted in Annapolis Royal. In 1634 the governor of Acadia, Isaac de Razilly, wrote, “Bordeaux vines have been planted that are doing very well,” making the first mention of wine grape cultivation anywhere in Canada. . Razilly's vineyard in La Hève (now LaHave — Riverport to be precise). The Kentville Research Station in Kentville, Nova Scotia began working with experimental grape varieties in 1913. One of the most successful varieties was the grape Vineland 53261, originally produced in Vineland, Ontario, and now commonly known as L'Acadie Blanc.

A Cellared in Canada wine operation began in Truro in 1964 as part of the Peller brand, but commercial grape production in Nova Scotia is undocumented until 1979 with the arrival of Grand Pre Winery, owned by Roger Dial, founder of Appellation America. As Dial was planting and growing the L'Acadie Blanc variety and others at his vineyard in Grand Pre, Jost Vineyards under Hans Jost also began in the early 1980s on the Malagash Point peninsula next to the warm waters of the Northumberland Strait and Amet Sound. The Jost vineyard is still known as the longest running winery in Nova Scotia.

The industry has since expanded slowly but steadily, introducing wineries such as St. Famille, Gaspereau Vineyards, Blomidon Estate Winery in the 1990s and fruit wineries such as Lunenburg County Winery. In 2003, the Wine Association of Nova Scotia (WANS) was created, of which most participants of the industry are members. The organization has served to promote and coordinate the efforts of the province's wineries. By 2015 there were 70 grape growers and nearly two dozen wineries in the province. In December of that year, the provincial government announced funding to support the expansion of the industry, with a goal of doubling production by 2020.

Climate 
Nova Scotia's climate varies from region to region and grapes grow best where there is a favorable microclimate. Each region's temperatures and soils differ significantly, allowing for different varieties to excel in separate areas. In good climates in the province, temperatures rarely drop below -23 degrees Celsius, allowing greater variety of vines to be grown compared to colder regions such as the Cape Breton Island.

Varieties 
Nova Scotia's primary focus on grape growing for wine production had been hybrid vines, due to their cold hardy and disease-resistant nature. In recent years, Nova Scotia's wineries attempted to grow vinifera in significant amounts, to moderate success.

Hybrid Vines 

 L'Acadie blanc
 Seyval Blanc
 Vidal Blanc
 New York Muscat
 Mischurnitz
 Seyverni
 Geisenheim 318
 Baco Noir
 Marechal Foch
 Luci Kuhlmann 
 Leon Millot
 Castel
 Cabernet Foch
 De Chaunac
 Marquette

Vinifera Vines

Chardonnay
Pinot Noir
Pinot Gris
Riesling
Sauvignon Blanc
Cabernet Franc
Chasselas
Gamay Noir

Styles

Sparkling
Outside Nova Scotia, it is best known for its sparkling wine, as most production is consumed locally. Wineries including Benjamin Bridge, L'Acadie Vineyards, and Blomidon Estate Winery have developed extensive sparkling wine programs focusing on those produced in the traditional method style. Some of them are sold outside the province.

White
Nova Scotia white wines exhibit a crisp, fruity nature. Though for some time only hybrid white grapes were produced in any quantity, white vinifera in Nova Scotia have seen some level of success, particularly with Chardonnay and Riesling.

Tidal Bay
The appellation blend of Nova Scotia was created by the wineries of the province and WANS, and was initially released in 2012. Intended to highlight the white wines of the region, Tidal Bay features 100% Nova Scotia grown grapes held to a rigorous set of standards to ensure they remain within the stylistic guidelines.

Red
Reds in Nova Scotia remain relatively unknown outside of the province. Most red vinifera will not ripen to an acceptable level for table wines in Nova Scotia, though Pinot Noir and Gamay grapes have been produced to some success in the Bear River valley at the western end of the Annapolis Valley. Nonetheless, there is popular local demand for hybrid reds, including Baco Noir, Maréchal Foch, Luci Kuhlmann, and Leon Millot.

Icewine
Icewine is produced by most wineries, primarily with the Vidal Blanc grape, though others, including Riesling, have been used. Production in the province is small enough that most production is done by an independent grower, Warner Vineyards in Lakeville.

See also
 British Columbia wine
 Ontario wine
 Quebec wine

References

External links

 Wine Growers of Nova Scotia
 Grape Growers' Association of Nova Scotia

Canadian wine
Wine regions of Canada
Cuisine of Nova Scotia
Alcohol in Nova Scotia